Jochen Asche was an East German luger who competed during the 1960s. He won the bronze medal in the men's singles event at the 1962 FIL World Luge Championships in Krynica, Poland. He was an athlete of the Wintersportverein und Bobclub Friedrichroda.

References

German male lugers
Possibly living people
Year of birth missing